WEC 16: Clash of the Titans 2 was a mixed martial arts event promoted by World Extreme Cagefighting on August 18, 2005 at the Tachi Palace Hotel & Casino in Lemoore, California. The main event saw Ron Waterman take on Ricco Rodriguez
for the WEC Super Heavyweight Championship.

Results

See also 
 World Extreme Cagefighting
 List of World Extreme Cagefighting champions
 List of WEC events
 2005 in WEC

References

External links
 WEC 16 Results at Sherdog.com

World Extreme Cagefighting events
2005 in mixed martial arts
Mixed martial arts in California
Sports in Lemoore, California
2005 in sports in California